Konrad Albert Schmidt (born August 2, 1984) is a former professional baseball catcher who played for the Arizona Diamondbacks of Major League Baseball (MLB) in 2010 and 2012.

Career
Schmidt attended Petaluma High School in Petaluma, California. He attended Santa Rosa Junior College after high school. While at SRJC, The Bearcubs won a CA Juco State Championship. He then went to the University of Arizona, where he played for the Arizona Wildcats baseball team, but transferred to the University of Nevada, Reno, where he played for the Nevada Wolf Pack baseball team.

Schmidt was undrafted out of college, and signed with the Arizona Diamondbacks. He received his first promotion to the major leagues on September 13, 2010.

In his two seasons with the Diamondbacks, Schmidt went 1-for-15 in eight games with one run and two RBIs. On November 1, 2012, Schmidt was claimed off waivers by the Texas Rangers. He's currently playing in the Dominican Winter League with Cibao.

He signed a minor league contract with Cincinnati Reds on March 27, 2013.
He was released by the Reds on June 13, 2013.

References

External links

1984 births
Living people
Sportspeople from Santa Rosa, California
Yakima Bears players
Visalia Oaks players
South Bend Silver Hawks players
Reno Aces players
Visalia Rawhide players
Mobile BayBears players
Arizona Wildcats baseball players
Nevada Wolf Pack baseball players
Arizona Diamondbacks players
Louisville Bats players
St. Cloud River Bats players
Gigantes del Cibao players
American expatriate sportspeople in the Dominican Republic
Scottsdale Scorpions players